Aranda is an American rock band from Oklahoma City, Oklahoma, United States. The band is composed of Dameon and Gabe Aranda. Their latest album Recollections Of A Painted Year was released on July 29, 2022 through The Fuel Music.

History

Self-titled debut album (2001–2010) 
Dameon and Gabe Aranda have been creating music since an early age. The band became Aranda in 2001 and signed to Epic Records after years of playing locally in Oklahoma City with various groups under various names such as "Image" and "Freewill" in the 1990s. After recording an album for Epic they were let go from the label following a massive structural overhaul. Original drummer Armando Lopez left the band in 2003 to join No Justice. Mike Walker joined the band to record "The 405 Sessions" in 2004 and became a permanent member when the band signed to Astonish Records in 2006. The band's first full-length record, Aranda, was released on April 22, 2008. The first single, "Still in the Dark", peaked at No. 31 on the Hot Mainstream Rock Tracks chart. Aranda has toured with bands like The All-American Rejects, Buckcherry, Sevendust, Anew Revolution, Since October, Edisun, Saliva, Shinedown, Puddle of Mudd, Theory of a Deadman, Black Stone Cherry, Shaman's Harvest, and Tantric. They also were on tour with Halestorm, Adelitas Way, 3 Doors Down, and Daughtry. In 2010 Aranda performed at Rocklahoma in Pryor, Oklahoma. They were nominated in 2012 for a RadioContraband Rock Radio Award for Indie Artist of the Year. In 2015 it was announced that Aranda would perform at the 10th Rock on the Range festival in Columbus, Ohio in May 2016.

Stop the World (2010–2014) 
Aranda announced via Facebook their new album would be called "Stop the World", and on July 1, 2011, they released the lead single, "Undone". On January 31, 2012, Stop the World was released on iTunes. The album was produced by Grammy-nominated producer Johnny K, and has 10 songs. Aranda became signed to Wind-up Records in mid-2012.

Not the Same (2015–present) 
On  June 30, 2015, Aranda released their third studio album Not the Same featuring the tracks "Don’t Wake Me" and "We Are the Enemy". Produced by Kato Khandwala, the release peaked at number 12 on the Billboard Heatseeker Albums Chart.

In popular culture

"Whyyawannabringmedown" was used as official theme for WWE's PPV The Bash, and later, recorded by Grammy Award winner Kelly Clarkson.
"All I Ever Wanted" was also recorded by Kelly Clarkson for her fourth record, which was named after the song, and is the fourth single from the album.

Discography

Studio albums
 Aranda (2008)
 Stop the World (2012)
 Not the Same (2015) #12 Billboard Heatseeker Albums
 Recollections of a Painted Year (2022)

Singles

Music videos

References

External links
Aranda's official website
Aranda's Wind-Up Records page
arandaVEVO on YouTube

Musical groups from Oklahoma
American pop rock music groups
American post-grunge musical groups
American alternative metal musical groups
Epic Records artists
Musical groups from Oklahoma City